Kenneth Henry Downing (5 December 1917 – 3 May 2004) was a British racing driver, soldier and businessman. He raced for Connaught in the 1952 Formula One season, notably qualifying for the British Grand Prix and Dutch Grand Prix.  

Downing fought in the British expeditionary force during the Second World War and was sent to France before the Dunkirk evacuation. He began racing at 21, competing in his first event the Eastbourne Rally and in sports car races throughout the late 1940s before entering into Formula One. Downing moved to South Africa in the 1953 where he began a business mining sea diamonds at the mouth of the Orange river. He later lived in Monaco until his death in 2004.

Family 
Downing was born into a wealthy family, whose interests included material manufacturing and transport. He was the son of George Henry Downing, JP, High Sheriff of Staffordshire, of Clayton Lodge in Newcastle-under-Lyme. His sister, Eleanor Downing, married Frank Skailes and was the mother of Ian 'Mo' Skailes and David Skailes, successful Ferrari racing drivers. In 1942 Downing married Elizabeth Keane, with whom he had three children.

Racing career 
He began racing at 21, competing in his first event the Eastbourne Rally in a Healey, and competed in sports car races throughout the late 1940s after the war. Initially racing a Brooke Special, he switched to a Connaught in 1951, winning 17 races throughout the year.

Downing switched to single seaters in 1952, racing a Connaught A-Type, and won the Madgwick Cup at Goodwood and second place at the Grand Prix des Frontières at Chimay, Belgium, where he lost the lead at the end of the race several metres before the finish line.

He finished ninth in his first World Championship event at Silverstone for the British Grand Prix, but had run fourth in the race ahead of Alberto Ascari before spinning while avoiding a backmarker. Racing alongside fellow Connaught drivers, Kenneth McAlpine, Eric Thompson and Dennis Poore, Downing had qualified on the second grid and was the highest placed British driver. He competed in the  later that year, but then retired from an oil-pressure problem. 

At the end of the 1952 season he sold all of his cars and switched to an Aston Martin DB3S. He contested the Silverstone International several times and finished in third place at Thruxton in May. In 1953 he decided to retire from racing in order to focus on managing the family business.

South Africa and later life 
In 1953 after the death of his mother, Downing and his family emigrated to Constantia, Cape Town. In 1955 he established a company mining sea diamonds near the border of Namibia, constructing a dredger to dredge diamonds at the mouth of the Orange river that had been washed down from the Kimberley diamond mines. The business was successful and along with the mining rights, was eventually sold to De Beers, an international mining corporation. He had also formed the idea of mining guano on an island near Madagascar, but this was delayed.

Downing died on 3 May 2004 at the Loews Hotel in Monaco.

Complete Formula One World Championship results
(key)

References 

1917 births
2004 deaths
Connaught Formula One drivers
English expatriates in Monaco
English emigrants to South Africa
English racing drivers
English Formula One drivers
People from Chesterton, Staffordshire